TU4 (ТУ4) is a Soviet narrow-gauge diesel locomotive for the track gauge of .

History
The first TU4 was built in 1962 at the Kambarka Engineering Works. 3210 TU4 locomotives were produced until 1974. The locomotives were used on many narrow-gauge railways to move cargo as well as passenger trains.

See also
Kambarka Engineering Works

References

External links

 Official website Kambarka Engineering Works (Russian language)
 TU4 diesel locomotive (Russian language)
 TU4 diesel locomotive (Russian language)

750 mm gauge locomotives
Diesel locomotives of the Soviet Union
Diesel locomotives of Russia
Diesel locomotives of Finland
Diesel locomotives of Sweden
Diesel locomotives of Estonia
Diesel locomotives of Ukraine